Deanne (Dee) Sharon Ryall (born 16 June 1967) is an Australian politician. She was a member of the Victorian Legislative Assembly representing the electorate of Mitcham for the Liberal Party from 2010 to 2014 and Ringwood from 2014 to 2018.

Personal life
Ryall grew up in Blackburn North, Victoria, where she attended and gained her Higher School Certificate from Blackburn High School.
Ryall completed her Certificate of Nursing at The Alfred Hospital in 1988 and in 1991 completed a Bachelor of Nursing from La Trobe University.

She was involved in business for 15 years as a specialist in management systems.

Political career
Ryall contested the 2010 Victorian State election in the marginal electorate of Mitcham in metropolitan Melbourne, representing the Liberal Party, winning 52.90% of the vote after preferences had been distributed. Mitcham had been held by Brumby Government Minister Tony Robinson on a margin of 2%.

References

External links
 Parliamentary voting record of Dee Ryall at Victorian Parliament Tracker

1967 births
Living people
Liberal Party of Australia members of the Parliament of Victoria
Members of the Victorian Legislative Assembly
21st-century Australian politicians
21st-century Australian women politicians
Women members of the Victorian Legislative Assembly
People educated at Blackburn High School
People from Blackburn, Victoria
Politicians from Melbourne